Perrona subspirata is a species of sea snail, a marine gastropod mollusk in the family Clavatulidae.

Description
The length of the shell attains 25.5 mm, its diameter 11 mm.

Distribution
This species occurs in the Atlantic Ocean off Angola.

References

 von Martens, E. (1902) Einige neue Arten von Meer-Conchylien aus den Sammlungen der deutschen Tiefsee-Expedition. Sitzungs-Berichte der Gesellschaft Naturforschender Freunde zu Berlin, 1902, 237–244.

External links
 
 Martens, Eduard von, - Thiele, Johannes, Die beschalten Gasteropoden der deutschen Tiefsee-Expedition, 1898–1899; Jena,G. Fischer,1904
 Specimen at MNHN, Paris

Endemic fauna of Angola
subspirata
Gastropods described in 1902